John McDermott (born 26 February 1980) is an English former professional boxer who competed from 2000 to 2013. He is a three-time challenger for the British heavyweight title and in his last fight in March 2013, won the English heavyweight title.

Professional career 
On 18 April 2008, McDermott won the vacant BBBofC English heavyweight title, knocking out Pele Reid in the second round. He had fought for the same title in 2004 losing on that occasion to Mark Krence. 

In September 2007, he had also become the mandatory challenger for a second shot at the British title after beating Scott Gammer on points over 10 rounds. He had fought for the title once before in December 2005 losing in the 1st round to Matt Skelton.

McDermott faced Danny Williams at Goresbrook Leisure Centre, Dagenham on 18 July 2008 for the British Title, but was defeated controversially by a majority points decision. He was defeated again in the rematch on 2 May 2009, via a split points decision. 

McDermott lost his English heavyweight title to Tyson Fury in another controversial decision on 11 September. Referee Terry O'Connor, scored the fight 98-92 in favour of Fury. After the referee handed the decision to Fury, Sky Sports commentator Jim Watt asked; "Has he [O'Connor] got the names mixed up?" Jim Watt along with other commentators Glenn McCrory, Johnny Nelson all scored the fight to McDermott, as did David Haye. Fury defeated McDermott in a rematch on 25 June 2010. McDermott won a unanimous points decision against Matt Skelton on 16 March 2013 to regain the English Heavyweight title. He never defended this belt and the vacant title was eventually contested in June 2018, when Daniel Dubois stopped Tom Little.

Professional boxing record

References

External links
 
 Profile at BritishBoxing.net

1980 births
Living people
People from Horndon-on-the-Hill
Sportspeople from Basildon
English male boxers
Heavyweight boxers
England Boxing champions